Juan Salas (born November 7, 1978) is a professional baseball relief pitcher. Salas signed with Tampa Bay on July 8, as an amateur free agent, and made his Major League debut September 5, .

Salas is notable for being converted from playing third base to pitching while in the Devil Rays' minor league system. Salas became a pitcher in the  season and had a 1-0 record and 4.82 ERA for the Rookie-Level Princeton Devil Rays. He split the  season between the High-A Visalia Oaks and the Double-A Montgomery Biscuits.

The 2006 season was the breakout year in Salas' minor-league career; he gave up no earned runs in 23 games for Montgomery, earned 14 saves, and struck out 52 batters in 34 innings. This earned him an appearance in the  All-Star Futures Game for the World Team. He was called up to the Triple-A Durham Bulls, with whom he went 1-1 with a 1.57 ERA and three saves in 27 games, striking out 33 batters in 28 innings. In 2007, he went 1-1 with a 3.95 ERA in 12 games and was suspended in May for 50 games for using performance-enhancing drugs. To take his place on the roster, the Devil Rays recalled Tim Corcoran from Durham.

Salas started the  season on the restricted list due to problems obtaining a visa to come to the United States. He missed spring training and did not arrive in the United States until April 17, 2008, several weeks after the 2008 MLB season started. He reported to the Triple-A Durham Bulls for a rehab assignment beginning May 9.

On February 12, Salas was designated for assignment. He was traded to the Cleveland Indians on February 19,  for minor league infielder Isaias Valasquez. He was released on May 6.

See also
List of sportspeople sanctioned for doping offences

References

External links

Baseball-Almanac.com
Salas' question answered by BaseballAmerica.com
Inside The Dugout Futures Game discussion

1978 births
Living people
Arizona League Indians players
Bakersfield Blaze players
Charleston RiverDogs players
Columbus Clippers players
Dominican Republic expatriate baseball players in the United States
Dominican Republic sportspeople in doping cases
Durham Bulls players
Hudson Valley Renegades players

Major League Baseball pitchers
Major League Baseball players from the Dominican Republic
Major League Baseball players suspended for drug offenses 
Montgomery Biscuits players
Orlando Rays players
Princeton Devil Rays players
Tampa Bay Devil Rays players
Tampa Bay Rays players